Karlsplatz is the name of several transit stations in Central Europe:

 Karlsplatz (Vienna U-Bahn) in Vienna, Austria
 Karlsplatz Stadtbahn Station, a disused station in Vienna, Austria
 Karlsplatz station (Essen) in Essen, Germany
 Munich Karlsplatz station in Munich, Germany